Henricus Everhardus Maria "Henk" Nieuwkamp (born 15 July 1942) is a retired Dutch cyclist who was active between 1959 and 1970. On track he competed at the 1968 Summer Olympics in the 4 km team putsuit. On the road he won the Ronde van Limburg in 1967, as well as individual stages of the Olympia's Tour (1968 and 1970) and Milk Race (1970).

See also
 List of Dutch Olympic cyclists

References

1942 births
Living people
Olympic cyclists of the Netherlands
Cyclists at the 1968 Summer Olympics
Dutch male cyclists
People from Borne, Overijssel
Cyclists from Overijssel